The IPW:UK Women's Championship was a women's professional wrestling championship created and promoted by the English professional wrestling promotion, International Pro Wrestling: United Kingdom.  The championship was originally established on 20 December 2015 and Tennessee Honey was the inaugural champion.

Title history

The championship was originally established on 20 December 2015 at Christmas Cracker 2015. Tennessee Honey defeated Addy Starr with Jetta as the special guest ref. to become the inaugural champion.

{{Professional wrestling title history middle
|number   = 8
|champion = 
|reign    = 1
|date     = 
|days     = 
|location = Rochester, Kent, England
|event    = The Big Bang: Undisputed
|notes    = 
|ref      = <ref>

Combined reigns

See also
IPW:UK World Championship
IPW:UK Tag Team Championship
IPW:UK Junior Heavyweight Championship

References

External links 
 IPW Women's Championship
International Pro Wrestling: United Kingdom championships
National professional wrestling championships
Women's professional wrestling championships
Professional wrestling in the United Kingdom